Magnetic water treatment (also known as anti-scale magnetic treatment or AMT) is a method of supposedly reducing the effects of hard water by passing it through a magnetic field as a non-chemical alternative to water softening.  Magnetic water treatment is regarded as unproven and unscientific. A 1996 study by Lawrence Livermore National Laboratory found no significant effect of magnetic water treatment on the formation of scale.

Vendors of magnetic water treatment devices frequently use pictures and testimonials to support their claims, but omit quantitative detail and well-controlled studies. Advertisements and promotions generally omit system variables, such as corrosion or system mass balance analyticals, as well as measurements of post-treatment water such as concentration of hardness ions or the distribution, structure, and morphology of suspended particles.

See also
 Fouling
 Laundry ball
 Magnet therapy

References

Water treatment
Fouling
Pseudoscience
Magnetic devices